Achilleas Aslanidis (born 5 January 1950) is a Greek former professional footballer who played as a forward.

He made 11 appearances for the Greece national team between 1973 and 1975.

Honours

Club
PAOK
Alpha Ethniki (1): 1975–76
Greek Cup (2): 1971–72, 1973–74

Panathinaikos
Alpha Ethniki (1): 1976–77
Greek Cup (1): 1976–77

References
 
 

1950 births
Living people
Greek footballers
Greece international footballers
Association football forwards
Super League Greece players
PAOK FC players
Panathinaikos F.C. players
Footballers from Thessaloniki